is a Japanese voice actress and narrator from Yamagata Prefecture who is currently affiliated with Office PAC. After Yūko Mizutani's death, she became the official Japanese dub voice of Minnie Mouse, and has taken over many of Mizutani's other roles. Her hobby is swimming.

Career
After graduating from high school, Endō moved to Tokyo to become a voice actress. She enrolled in the Performing Arts Center, the training school of her current agency led by Nachi Nozawa, and graduated after repeating a year. She said that the reason she decided to go to the training school was because her parents knew Nozawa and thought he would be a safe option. When she was in the training school, she was not good at theater, and according to Nozawa, she once said that she hated theater. She wanted to do plays, but did not want to act in love scenes, and she was not allowed to graduate as a result, so Nozawa decided to make plays without love scenes. In addition, since she originally wanted to be a voice actor, the principal's words about being an actor before being a voice actor weighed heavily on those around him, and when the class and the school were asked who wanted to be a voice actor, Endō was the only one who raised her hand.

Her first regular TV anime role was as Kasumi Horiguchi in Oku-sama wa Joshi Kōsei in 2005, and since gaining recognition as Miyuki Takara in Lucky Star in 2007, she has played Sheryl Nome in Macross Frontier and Angelique in Neo Angelique in 2008. In the internet radio program Plume Monogatari, she formed the voice acting unit "Plume" with Manabi Mizuno and Shiho Kawaragi, but it is currently inactive.

Endō won the theme song award (Radio Kansai Award) at the 12th Animation Kobe for Motteke! Sailor Fuku, the opening theme song for the TV animation Lucky Star, and in 2008, she won the Best Singing award at the 2nd Seiyu Awards together with Aya Hirano, Emiri Katō and Kaori Fukuhara. In 2009, she won the Best Supporting Actress award at the 3rd Seiyu Awards.

On August 8, 2013, Endō reported her marriage on her blog.

Filmography

Anime

Film

Video games

Dubbing roles

Animation 
The Fairly Oddparents - Veronica
Ice Age - Peaches
My Little Pony: Friendship is Magic - Silver Spoon

References

External links
 Office PAC profile 
 
 

1980 births
Living people
Japanese video game actresses
Japanese voice actresses
Voice actresses from Yamagata Prefecture
21st-century Japanese actresses